The Spain women's national ice hockey team represents Spain at the International Ice Hockey Federation's IIHF World Women's Championships. The women's national team is controlled by Federación Española de Deportes de Hielo. As of 2011, Spain has 63 female players. The Selección Nacional Femenina de Hockey is ranked 35th in the world.

History
The Selección Nacional Femenina de Hockey had their debut at an international event at Cergy in France, where they lost the event's opening match on 21 May 2009 against a Bavarian selection, with a score of 1–10. They also celebrated their first victory on the same day, beating the Lady Panthers Grefrath 4–0. Their first match against another national team at that event was their match against Belgium on 22 May 2009, which they lost 1–3.

In 2009 the Selección Nacional Femenina de Hockey was the first time involved in the World Championship competition but the 2009 World Women's Championship Division V did not play. The tournament was cancelled. The reasons seem to be multiple. No country wanted to assume the financial costs of the tournament.

The Spanish national team had their World Championship debut at the 2011 Women's World Ice Hockey Championships, where they were scheduled to meet the Bulgarian, Irish, Polish and Turkish national teams in the Division V event in Sofia from 14 to 20 March 2011.
15 March: Spain 7–0 Turkey
16 March: Spain 7–0 Bulgaria
18 March: Poland 5–4 Spain
19 March: Spain 14–0 Ireland

Olympic record
The Spain Women hockey team has never qualified for an Olympic tournament.

World Championship record

References

External links

IIHF profile
National Teams of Ice Hockey

Ice hockey in Spain
I
Women's national ice hockey teams in Europe